BCI Engineers & Scientists, Inc. was an engineering/geology consulting company specializing in the water and mining sectors. It was based in Lakeland, Florida and had offices in Orlando, Minneola, Jupiter, Florida, as well as Howell, Michigan. In 2011, Amec Foster Wheeler acquired the company for $20 million.

BCI's founder Dr. Leslie Bromwell was a consultant and team leader for the restoration and preservation of the Herbert Hoover Dike, which surrounds Florida's Lake Okeechobee.

References

2011 disestablishments in Florida
2011 mergers and acquisitions
Defunct engineering companies of the United States
American companies established in 1977
American companies disestablished in 2011